Crittenton may refer to:

Crittenton, Inc., Boston, Massachusetts–based non-profit organization whose mission was to help young people
Charles Nelson Crittenton (1833–1909), manufacturer and distributor of medicines, Protestant evangelist, philanthropist, co-founder of the National Florence Crittenton Mission
Javaris Crittenton (born 1987), American former professional basketball player and convicted murderer
James Crittenton Lucas (1912–1998), American criminal who served a life sentence in Alcatraz

See also
Florence Crittenton Home (Little Rock, Arkansas), historic house at 3600 West 11th Street in Little Rock, Arkansas
The National Crittenton Foundation, Portland, Oregon-based American organization
Florence Crittenton Home and Maternity Hospital, also known as Crittenton Center, historic buildings in Sioux City, Iowa, US
National Florence Crittenton Mission, organization established in 1883 by Charles N. Crittenton
Crittenton Women's Union, Boston, Massachusetts–based non-profit organization
Crittenden (disambiguation)
Crittendens
Cruttenden